Centennial Airport  is a public use airport owned by the Arapahoe County Public Airport Authority in the Denver-Aurora metropolitan area, 15 nautical miles (17 mi, 28 km) southeast of downtown Denver, Colorado, United States. Located in Dove Valley, a census designated place in Arapahoe County, the airport's runways extend into Douglas County.

Facilities
The airport opened on May 12, 1968, as Arapahoe County Airport, and was renamed on July 13, 1984. The new name reflects Colorado's admission to the Union as the 38th state in 1876, the centennial of the United States Declaration of Independence.

In 1985 a new control tower was built. It is an international airport with continuous U.S. Customs services and is one of the busiest general aviation airports in the United States with an average of 874 operations per day. The Federal Aviation Administration control tower and associated air traffic control services are continuous; Runway 35R has a Category I Instrument Approach.

Centennial Airport covers 1,400 acres (567 ha) at an elevation of 5,885 feet (1,794 m). It has three asphalt runways: 17L/35R is 10,000 by 100 feet (3,048 x 30 m); 17R/35L is 7,001 by 77 feet (2,134 x 23 m); 10/28 is 4,800 by 75 feet (1,463 x 23 m). In 2018 the airport had 337,947 aircraft operations, average 925 per day: 89% general aviation, 10% air taxi, and 2% military. 840 aircraft were then based at this airport: 569 single-engine, 104 multi-engine, 147 jet, and 20 helicopter.

Key Lime Air has its corporate headquarters on the airport property. Air Methods previously did as well; it moved to Greenwood Village, Colorado in 2017.

The National Plan of Integrated Airport Systems for 2011–2015 categorized the airport as a reliever airport.

Cargo destinations

Accidents and Incidents
On November 19, 1979, a Cessna 500 Citation I operated by National Jet industries, a cargo flight, crashed on an improper IFR approach to runway 34 due to icing conditions. Two of the three occupants died.
On July 2, 1984, a Bell 206B helicopter, N3173L, suddenly rolled over and crashed at Centennial Airport, killing the pilot and single passenger. Investigators found that the connector that retained the cyclic stick had broken due to a loose retaining nut, and attributed the accident to improper maintenance, with the manufacturer's inadequate preflight checklist being a contributing factor. Fifteen days after the crash, Bell Helicopter issued a safety notice advising operators to check quick removal flight controls for proper installation prior to flight—guidance which was previously omitted from the manufacturer's checklists.
 On December 17, 2004, a Cessna 421, N421FR, drifted to the right on takeoff from runway 17L, crossing the median and runway 17R, then suddenly rolled very steeply to the right, struck the ground with the right wing low, and cartwheeled. The aircraft was destroyed and the three occupants—a student pilot, a flight instructor, and a second instructor riding as a passenger—were killed. Ground witnesses reported that the pilots made several unsuccessful attempts to start the engines, and discussed taking the aircraft to a shop for repairs, but ultimately got the engines running and initiated the flight. Investigators found fuel system anomalies indicative of a fuel line blockage, and attributed the accident to a loss of engine power due to fuel starvation, and to the flight instructor's failure to perform proper emergency procedures and abort the flight.
 On May 12, 2021, a Cirrus SR22 and Key Lime Air Flight 970, a Swearingen SA226-TC Metroliner operating a charter cargo flight, collided on approach to Centennial Airport. The Cirrus made a safe off-airport parachute-assisted landing, while the Key Lime pilot landed safely at Centennial despite the loss of a section of the cabin roof, damage to the empennage, and failure of one engine. There were no injuries.
 On June 16th, 2021, a Lancair Evolution plane crashed south of Centennial while on final approach. The plane collided with several power lines and started a brush fire which was contained by fire crews. The two occupants and a dog were killed in the crash.
On August 9, 2022, a Cessna 182 Skylane crashed off the departure end of Runway 10. There was a fuel leak on the scene. The sole pilot onboard was killed. The cause of the crash is under investigation.

See also 
 List of airports in the Denver area
 List of airports in Colorado

References

External links

 Centennial Airport, official site
 Centennial Airport (APA) at Colorado DOT airport directory
 Aerial image as of April 2002 from USGS The National Map
 
 

Airports in Colorado
Transportation buildings and structures in Douglas County, Colorado
Transportation buildings and structures in Arapahoe County, Colorado